Coles Group Limited  is an Australian public company operating several retail chains. Its chief operations are primarily concerned with the sale of food and groceries through its flagship supermarket chain Coles Supermarkets, and the sale of liquor and petrol through its Coles Liquor and Coles Express outlets. Since its foundation in Collingwood, Victoria in 1914, Coles has grown to become the second-largest retailer in Australia after its principal rival Woolworths in terms of revenue.

Formerly known as Coles Myer Ltd. from 1986 to 2006, Coles Group was owned by Western Australian conglomerate Wesfarmers from 2007 until 2018, when it was spun-off, with it once again listed as an independent public company on the Australian Stock Exchange, containing Coles Supermarkets, Coles Online, Coles Express, Coles' liquor division, Coles' financial division and Flybuys.

History

G.J. Coles & Coy (1914–1986)
In 1914, the first Coles "variety store" was opened in Melbourne. Coles was founded in 1914 by George Coles when he opened what was called the "Coles Variety Store" in Smith Street in the Melbourne suburb of Collingwood. More stores opened and the chain was regarded as the leaders in providing value to Australian shoppers. The building formerly occupied by the original Coles Variety Store is now the location of a Woolworths outlet – the major competitor to Coles.

Coles was run in succession by members of the Coles family from 1914 until the mid-1970s by the "famous five knights", brothers Sir George, Sir Arthur, Sir Edgar, Sir Kenneth and Sir Norman – known by their first initials – GJ, AW, EB, KF, NC.

In 1960, the first supermarket was opened in the Melbourne suburb of North Balwyn and in 1973, a Coles store had been established in all capital cities of the country.

Kmart Australia Limited was born out of a joint venture between G.J. Coles & Coy (Coles) and S.S. Kresge (later Kmart Corporation) in the US. The first store opened in the Melbourne suburb of Burwood in 1969. In 1978, Kresge (Kmart) exchanged its 51% stake in Kmart Australia for a 20% stake in G.J. Coles & Coy Coles, allowing Coles Myer to fully acquire Kmart Australia.

Coles Myer (1986–2006)

By the 1980s, Coles primarily operated supermarkets, whilst Myer (Myer Emporium Limited) operated the department store chains Myer and Grace Bros, as well as the Target discount variety store chain in Australia, and fast food restaurant chain Red Rooster (which it acquired in 1981). Both Coles and Myer grew throughout Australia through growth and acquisitions, and both independently listed on the Australian Stock Exchange. In August 1985, the Myer Emporium Ltd and GJ Coles & Coy Ltd merged, becoming the largest ever Australian Corporation. The official name change to "Coles Myer Limited" followed in January 1986. The U.S. Kmart Corporation continued to hold shareholding in the merged company until Kmart sold its 21.5% stake in November 1994.

A new head office opened in 1987 at Hawthorn East, Melbourne. As of 2022, it remained the head office for Coles Group and associated subsidiaries.

Bi-Lo was acquired by Coles Myer in 1987. It was a major supermarket chain and continued to be owned and operated by Coles Myer in parallel to Coles Supermarkets. Bi-Lo was rebranded to Coles from 2007, the last store rebranded in 2017.

The office stationery chain Officeworks, based on the US chain Office Depot, was established in 1993 with the first store opening in the Melbourne suburb of Richmond in June 1994. This represented a successful introduction of a "category killer" – by comparison, around the same time Coles unsuccessfully attempted to negate the arrival of Toys "R" Us with the short-lived chain World 4 Kids.

In 1996, the operations of Target and Fosseys (earlier "Coles-Fossey") merged and the first Baby Target speciality store was opened, followed in 1998 by Target Home. In 1999, regional Fosseys stores were re-badged as Target Country, with metropolitan stores closed. Following Target's operating loss of $43m in 2001, the chain's format was repositioned to compete less with Kmart, Woolworths Limited's Big W, Harris Scarfe and The Warehouse, and more with Myer, with a focus on "middle class" quality products, especially clothing and home wares.

In 1998, Coles Myer opened the first Megamart store, in Coorparoo, Queensland. Harris Technology, a computer hardware and software reseller started by Ron Harris in 1986, was acquired in 1999.

By 2001, Coles Myer planned to expand the Megamart chain of furniture and electrical stores, but by 2005 had decided to divest the struggling chain. Six of the nine stores were sold to competitor Harvey Norman, with the remainder closed.

In 2001, the Company appointed John Fletcher, formerly of Brambles, as chief executive. Fletcher engineered a brief turnaround in the company's fortunes. Fletcher abolished the shareholder discount card, on the basis that it had eroded margins while providing little benefit, and was unpopular with institutional investors. Since their introduction in the early 1990s, the card had induced a tenfold increase in the number of Coles Myer's shareholders, with the overwhelming majority owning only small parcels of shares.

Fletcher also engineered the acquisition of the retail fuel operations of Shell Australia with the fuel outlets rebranded as Coles Express, allowing Coles Group to counter the success of Woolworths' discount petrol operation. Woolworths subsequently gained entry to part of Caltex Australia's network to provide a recognised brand for its fuel offer.

In 2002, Coles Myer sold Red Rooster to Western Australian company Australian Fast Foods.

Coles Group (2006–2007)
On 17 August 2005, Coles Myer announced that within 12 months, it would decide to demerge, divest or retain Myer. Thirteen expressions of interest were made for all or part of Myer. On 13 March 2006, Coles Myer announced it would sell Myer to a consortium controlled by US private equity group Newbridge Capital. The consortium also included the Myer family, who held a 5% stake. The sale was completed for A$1.4 bn on 2 June 2006. Coles Myer changed its name to "Coles Group Limited" in November 2006. Coles Group Limited also changed its listed code on the Australian Securities Exchange from CML to CGJ, which references back to its first ever registered company name of G.J. Coles & Coy Proprietary Limited. The company has in the past been listed on the NYSE (de-listed 6 January 2006), the New Zealand Stock Exchange (de-listed 1989) and the London Stock Exchange.

In August 2006, Coles announced that a group of private equity companies led by Kohlberg Kravis Roberts & Co. (KKR) was looking to buy the company, with an initial proposal of $14.50 per share. The Coles board rejected the offer stating it significantly undervalued the company, and was conditional on a due diligence process, without a guarantee that the deal would go ahead. A second proposal of $15.25 per share in October 2006 was rejected for largely the same reasons.

In November 2006, long-term senior supermarkets executive Peter Scott was dismissed for an unspecified breach of the company's code of conduct.

On 23 February 2007, the company announced a downgrade of expected earnings and that it was considering ownership options, including the possibility of a full sale of the business or restructuring such as a demerger. On 20 March 2007, it deferred its plans to rebrand Kmart under the Coles banner and create supercentres, and subsequently paused its conversion of BI-LO stores to Coles Supermarkets given the lack of success of this move.

On 23 March, Coles Group stated it planned to sell its businesses as either an entire package, or in three parts (Officeworks, Target and the remaining businesses Kmart, Coles, Bi-Lo, Liquorland, Vintage Cellars and First Choice Liquor).

On 3 April, Solomon Lew, the former chairman and long-time antagonist of the current board and management team, sold his 5.8% shareholding of the company. A large portion of these shares were bought by Wesfarmers, which was believed to be part of a consortium of bidders including Macquarie Bank, PEP and Permira. The share price at which the transaction took place was reportedly $16.47, then 2.2% above the market price. A bid for the entire company at this price would have valued Coles Group at A$19.7 billion, well above the two KKR proposals announced in 2006.

In May 2007, Coles reported its slowest sales growth in at least seven years with continuing poor performance from Coles Supermarkets and Kmart.

Acquisition by Wesfarmers (2007)
In July 2007, Wesfarmers announced it intended to buy Coles Group for $22 billion, the largest take-over bid in Australia. The sale was expected to be completed in October 2007.

In August 2007, Wesfarmers foreshadowed its plans for the restructuring of Coles Group following its anticipated takeover, including investment of A$5 billion, establishing three separate divisions (including a combined Bunnings/Officeworks "big box" retailing division), the possible sale of Kmart, and the exit of Coles Group from its head office base at Tooronga.

The independent expert report published in October 2007, advising shareholders preparatory to the proposed sale was critical of the culture within Coles Group.

At a shareholder meeting in Melbourne on 7 November 2007, shareholders voted overwhelmingly with 99.25% approval of the sale of Coles Group to Wesfarmers. The Scheme of Arrangement between Coles Group and its shareholders was approved by the Supreme Court of Victoria on 9 November 2007, the last day Coles Group shares traded on the Australian Securities Exchange. The Scheme was implemented on 23 November 2007, ending Coles Group as a company with its subsidiaries merged into Wesfarmers' business structure.

Spin-off (2018–present)
In November 2018, Coles Group Limited was spun-off from Wesfarmers on 21 November 2018, with the company once again listed as a public company on the Australian Stock Exchange under the trading code COL, debuting at A$12.49. At the time of listing, the company included 806 Coles Supermarkets, 712 Coles Express outlets, 894 liquor stores including Liquorland, Vintage Cellars and First Choice Liquor, Coles-branded financial services and 88 Spirit Hotels, as well as joint-ownership of the flybuys loyalty program. Subsidiaries of the previous Coles Group such as Kmart, Target and Officeworks remain as subsidiaries of Wesfarmers.

In September 2022, Coles announced that it would sell its Coles Express stations to Viva Energy for $300 million.

Businesses
 Coles Supermarkets: the second largest supermarket chain in Australia.
 Liquorland: Liquor chain, with some outlets attached to Coles Supermarkets, but run separately. Also operates some hotels via a subsidiary.
 Vintage Cellars: Liquor chain with an orientation towards fine wines and premium liquor.
 First Choice Liquor: Liquor chain comprising larger stores which compete more directly with Woolworths' Dan Murphy's. Had previously been two separate large-format stores, the more middle-market First Choice Liquor and the no frills Liquor Mart.
Coles Express: rebranded Shell convenience stores at Shell service stations offering retail and fuel products. Before Coles Myer Ltd took over Shell service stations, Coles Express was the name used for smaller, inner-urban Coles supermarkets which are now known as Coles Central. In September 2022, Coles announced that it would sell its Coles express stations to Viva Energy, the retailer of Shell in Australia.
flybuys: loyalty program.
Coles Local: Small-format stores.
 Chef Fresh: Food manufacturer Chef Fresh Pty Ltd, acquired chilled food producer Jewel Fine Foods Pty Ltd.

Former brands
 BI-LO: a budget supermarket chain. Until 2001, Bi-Lo traded as Newmart in Western Australia. In August 2006 Coles Group began to re-brand BI-LO stores as Coles Supermarket or divested them, but this activity was placed on hold in 2007 pending the sale of Coles Group.
 Coles SuperCentres were planned to open from September 2007, with many sourced from either existing Pick 'n Pay Hypermarkets or former 'Super K' stores, which were divided in the 1990s into separate Coles and Kmart stores. However these plans were put on hold in March 2007 pending the sale of Coles Group. Then in August 2007, Wesfarmers CEO Richard Goyder said super centres would almost certainly not be part of the Wesfarmers approach after taking over Coles Group.
 Harris Technology: Computer hardware and software reseller with a strong online presence, oriented towards corporate customers.
 The no frills Liquor Mart. Liquor Market merged into First Choice, with some stores retaining the lower cost product line up and yellow branding.
 Pick 'n Pay Hypermarket: two "hypermarkets" located in suburbs of Brisbane. (Rebranded to Coles and Kmart in late 2012)

References

 
Companies based in Melbourne
Retail companies of Australia
Retailing in Australia
2007 mergers and acquisitions
Australian grocers
Companies listed on the Australian Securities Exchange